Mike Bauer (born June 29, 1959) is a retired American tour professional tennis player. Bauer won three singles and nine top-tier doubles titles during his career.  He reached a career high singles ranking of world No. 29 in November 1984.

Career
An All-American in 1981 at University of California, Berkeley, Bauer won the 1982 Bangkok Grand Prix and 1982 and 1983 South Australian Open.  He was also a finalist at the 1983 Sydney Outdoor Grand Prix.  He reached the semi-finals in five other tournaments during his career.  His best Grand Slam result was reaching the 3rd round of Wimbledon in 1983 where he lost to eventual finalist Chris Lewis.  He reached the second round of the U.S. Open twice in four tries.

Bauer reached a career high doubles ranking of world No. 25, and won the 1981 Taipei Grand Prix and Manila Grand Prix, and 1982 Bangkok Grand Prix, tournaments partnering compatriot John Benson, the 1983 Stuttgart Outdoor partnering Anand Amritraj and Sydney Outdoor partnering Pat Cash, the 1992 Tel Aviv Grand Prix partnering João Cunha e Silva, the 1993 Casablanca Grand Prix partnering Piet Norval, and Santiago Grand Prix with Rikl, and the 1994 Vienna Grand Prix again with Rikl.  He was a finalist at the 1983 Maui Grand Prix partnering Scott Davis and 1984 Melbourne Grand Prix partnering Scott McCain, 1993 Zarazoga Grand Prix partnering David Rikl, Gerry Weber Open with Marc-Kevin Goellner, Tel Aviv partnering Rikl, and Vienna with David Prinosil.

Bauer was a member of the American Davis Cup team.  Mike graduated from Miramonte High School in Orinda, California.  He is the former Director of Tennis at Harbor Bay Club in Alameda, California. He regularly gave private lessons and directed the Summer Tennis Camp program.  He now lives in Germany with his family.

Grand Prix career finals

Singles (3 titles, 1 runner-up)

Doubles (9 titles, 6 runner-ups)

References

External links
 
 

1959 births
Living people
American male tennis players
California Golden Bears men's tennis players
Sportspeople from Oakland, California
Tennis people from California